L. elegans  may refer to:
 Laniisoma elegans, the shrike-like cotinga, a bird species found in Brazil, Venezuela, Colombia, Ecuador, Peru and Bolivia
 Latreillia elegans, a crab species found in the Mediterranean and the Atlantic
 Lenzites elegans, a plant pathogen
 Leptorhynchos elegans, a dinosaur species
 Liparoceras elegans, an ammonite species
Luzula elegans, a nematode species